The Innocent is a 2022 French drama film, directed by Louis Garrel, from a screenplay by Garrel, Tanguy Viel and Naïla Guiguet. It stars Roschdy Zem, Anouk Grinberg, Noémie Merlant and Garrel.

It had its world premiere at the 2022 Cannes Film Festival on 18 May 2022. It was released in France on 12 October 2022 by Ad Vitam Distribution. The film received a leading eleven nominations at the 48th César Awards, winning in two categories, including Best Original Screenplay and Best Supporting Actress for Merlant.

Cast
 Roschdy Zem as Michel
 Anouk Grinberg as Sylvie
 Noémie Merlant as Clémence
 Louis Garrel as Abel
 Jean-Claude Pautot as Jean-Paul
 Leghrib Rachid as détenu protégé de Michel cours de théâtre

Production
In December 2021, it was announced Roschdy Zem, Anouk Grinberg, Noémie Merlant, and Louis Garrel had joined the cast of the film, with Garrel set to direct from a screenplay by himself, Tanguy Viel and Naïla Guiguet.

Principal photography began in November 2021.

Release
It had its world premiere at the 2022 Cannes Film Festival in 18 May 2022. It was released in France on 12 October 2022.

Awards and nominations

References

External links
 

2022 films
2022 drama films
French drama films
Films directed by Louis Garrel
2020s French films